Carl Nathanael Burckhardt (13 January 1878, Lindau - 24 December 1923, Ligornetto) was a Swiss painter and sculptor. Although a modernist, his choice of subject matter was Neoclassically inspired.

Life and work 
After his father's early death, his family moved to Basel. He began his studies in 1896, as a student of the painter, Fritz Schider, then attended a private school operated by Heinrich Knirr in Munich. In 1899, he took a trip to Rome with his friend, Heinrich Altherr, drew his interests toward sculpting. In 1901, he started work on his first sculpture, featuring Zeus and Eros. He then came under the influence of Max Klinger and created a statue of Venus in 1904. Five years later, he won a competition for the design of niche figures and façade reliefs at the Kunsthaus Zürich. The reliefs featured Amazon figures that were cut by his assistant,  in 1912.

One of his best known works is an Amazon leading a horse, on the  Mittlere Brücke. It is also his last work. The casting was done after his death.

He was married to the painter, Sophie Hipp, younger sister of the painter . Their son was the religious scholar, Titus Burckhardt. He died after a brief illness at his home in Ticino.

A major retrospective was held in 2018 at the Museo Vincenzo Vela in Ligornetto.

Selected works

References

Further reading 
 Gianna A. Mina, Tomas Lochman (Eds.): Carl Burckhardt 1878–1923. Ein Bildhauer zwischen Basel, Rom und Ligornetto/Uno scultore tra Basilea, Roma e Ligornetto. Christoph Merian Verlag, Basel 2018, .
 Titus Burckhardt: Zeus und Eros. Briefe und Aufzeichnungen des Bildhauers Carl Burckhardt,  Urs-Graf-Verlag, Olten und Lausanne, 1919

External links 

  1998, überarbeitet 2011
  2003
 Publications on Carl Burckhardt @ the Katalog Helveticat of the Schweizerische Nationalbibliothek
 
 Wilhelm Barth: Obituary

1878 births
1923 deaths
Swiss painters
Swiss sculptors
People from Pfäffikon District